Penicillium ranomafanaense is a species of fungus in the genus Penicillium which isolated from soil in Ranomafana in Madagascar.

References 

ranomafanaense
Fungi described in 2014